Walter Lax (22 March 1912 –  1967) was an English footballer who scored 16 goals from 98 appearances in the Football League playing for Lincoln City, Blackpool and York City. He played as an outside left. He was also on the books of Coventry City without representing that club in the league, and played non-league football for Scunthorpe & Lindsey United as well as a couple of works teams.

References

1912 births
1967 deaths
People from Gainsborough, Lincolnshire
English footballers
Association football wingers
Lincoln City F.C. players
Blackpool F.C. players
Coventry City F.C. players
York City F.C. players
Scunthorpe United F.C. players
English Football League players
Date of death missing
Place of death missing